Ellen Jansø (2 July 1907 – 30 December 1981) was a Danish film actress. She appeared in twelve films between 1933 and 1951.

She was born and died in Denmark.

Selected filmography
Ud i den kolde sne (1934)
 Count Svensson (1951)
 Bag de røde porte (1951)
 Sommerglæder (1940)
 Familien Olsen (1940)
 Flådens blå matroser (1937)
 Inkognito (1937)
 Panserbasse (1936)
 Week-end (1935)
 Barken Margrethe (1934)
 København, Kalundborg og - ? (1934)
 Ud i den kolde sne (1934)
 Københavnere (1933)

External links

1907 births
1981 deaths
Danish film actresses
20th-century Danish actresses